Kathleen McGowan (born March 22, 1963) is an American author. Her novel The Expected One sold over a million copies worldwide and has appeared in over fifty languages.  She claims to be a descendant of Jesus Christ and Mary Magdalene.

The Magdalene Line series

The Magdalene Line is a series of novels, featuring both fictitious and historical female characters which the author believes history has either misrepresented or obliterated.

Kathleen McGowan began working on the first novel The Expected One in 1989. Focusing on the role of Mary Magdalene, it was self-published in 2005, and sold 2,500 copies. On July 25, 2006, the book was re-published by Simon & Schuster under the Touchstone imprint and became a New York Times Best Seller.

The second novel of the series is The Book of Love, published in 2009, focusing on the life of Mathilda of Canossa which is also a NYT Best Seller.

The third novel of the series is The Poet Prince, published in 2010, focusing on the life of Lorenzo de Medici another excellent book which is also a NYT best seller.

Each novel of the series features the fictitious heroine Maureen Paschal, who is tasked with uncovering alleged historical and Christian enigmas. Other fictitious characters include Berenger Sinclair and Tamara Wisdom, as well as the enigmatic character Destino.

The Source of Miracles

The Source of Miracles is a self-help book, based on the Lord's Prayers and offering the reader seven steps to transform their life. The process is based on the six-petalled rose depicted at the center of the Chartres cathedral labyrinth.

Works
 The Boleyn Heresy: The Time Will Come 2022
The Poet Prince, 2010
The Source of Miracles: Seven Steps to Transforming Your Life Through the Lord's Prayer, Fireside, 2009.
The Book of Love, 2009.
The Expected One, Touchstone, 2006. 
Sherdhana's Hand (lyrics)
The St Patrick's Day Song (lyrics)

Television appearances
She has appeared as a presenter on the History Channel and H2 television series Ancient Aliens. She has also appeared as a presenter on Bible Secrets Revealed, and made appearances in episodes during season 2 and season 5 of The Curse of Oak Island, both shows also on the History Channel.  On an episode of "Mysteries of the Bible" She emphatically stated that "a group of men with agendas of politics and economics and not spirituality, decided on the texts of the bible."

Personal life
She was married to Philip Coppens, who died in 2012.  Together they produced the internet radio program "The Spirit Revolution".

References

External links
Kathleen McGowan's personal website
McGowan's author's page at Simon&Schuster

Secrets of Mary Magdalene - Kathleen McGowan, Contributor, 2006

American historical novelists
Living people
21st-century American novelists
American women novelists
American women songwriters
Women historical novelists
1963 births
21st-century American women writers